Joseph Johann (Jupp) Kotalla (14 July 1908 – 31 July 1979) was a German SS soldier who was head of the administration and de facto deputy commander of Kamp Amersfoort concentration camp during World War II. He belonged to the infamous "" and afterwards to the Drie van Breda (Three from Breda), while he was serving a life sentence in Breda Prison after the war. Kotalla is the only German war criminal who died in Dutch captivity.

Family name 
The correct spelling of his family name is Kotalla, without umlaut. According to court documents from his Dutch trial after the Second World War, he indicated that his name is written with an umlaut. At his pardon on 1 August 1959, he tried to get an exemption and indicated that his surname was without an umlaut. in the Netherlands he remained known as Kotälla for a long time. In West-Germany he was always known as Kotalla without an umlaut.

Youth 
Kotalla was born in Upper Silesia, then German territory that was assigned to Poland after World War I. He was the oldest of five children. His father was the manager of a large local ironworks factory. After the war, the factory came into Polish hands. Kotalla's mother was an alcoholic, as were both his grandmothers. At the age of eleven, Kotalla suffered a severe concussion, which kept him in the hospital for a year and a half. Partly because of this, he was a bad student at school. When he was fourteen, he was temporarily committed to a mental institution. Kotalla's profession was representative.

World War II 
After the German invasion of Poland, Kotalla was called up for German military service. He was assigned to the SS and was wounded on the eastern front. When he had recovered, he left for the Netherlands in 1941. Kotalla came to work at the cell barracks of the Scheveningen prison. At that time he met his first wife, a woman from the German city of Kleve, whom he married in 1941. At the time of marriage she was 17 years old. In September 1942 he was appointed by Schutzhaftlagerführer II Karl Peter Berg in Kamp Amersfoort. He entered service there as a camp SS soldier and became head of the Schreibstube, the administration. He started his duties at Abteiling III (Section 3). 

Even after his appointment in Amersfoort, Kotalla was treated psychiatrically. From December 1942 to about April 1943 he was nursed in the psychiatric ward of a German military hospital. After his return from the hospital in Kamp Amersfoort he was called "UnterSchutzhaftlagerführer", in which position he replaced Berg as commander in his absence. As SS-Oberscharführer he was seconded to the Sicherheitsdienst of the camp. According to Kotalla, he continued to work in Kamp Amersfoort until 20 April 1945. Although he was still married, he had several mistress in the camp. In the course of 1944, Kotalla started a relationship with 21-year-old Louisa Johanna (Loes) van den Bogert, a Dutch typist who worked at Abteilung III of the camp.

Kotalla was described as the most notorious camp executioner of Kamp Amersfoort and was nicknamed The Executioner of Amersfoort. He had a short temper, took pervitine, drank liters of gin and mainly targeted Jews and priests. Kotalla was known, among other things, for his brutality during the daily roll call, kicking and hitting prisoners with a club. In one case, as a punishment exercise, he had prisoners lie on their backs and then stamped his boots over them. He delighted to give the prisoners only five minutes to finish their hot meal. In at least one instance, he let his sheepdog loose on a prisoner. He also kicked between the prisoners' legs; in the camp this was called the 'Kotalla Staircase'. Kotalla took part in a firing squad several times.

Condemnation 

On 14 December 1948, Kotalla was sentenced to death by the Amsterdam Special Court. The Special Council of Cassation had Kotalla undergo a psychiatric examination by a neurologist, who concluded on 4 October 1949 that he was "not diminished" while committing his crimes and that "his nervous disposition cannot excuse the many ill-treatments he committeded, since they too clearly exhibit a systematic character.” Partly on the basis of this conclusion, the death penalty was maintained on 5 December 1949. 

At the request of his lawyer, a second psychiatric examination was conducted which concluded in a report dated 18 March 1950: that he was indeed diminished. Finally, at the request of his counsel, Kotalla was examened by the psychiatrists  en  at the Psychiatric Observation Clinic in Utrecht. On 5 June 1951, they also indicated that Kotalla had diminished responsibility; according to them, Kotalla had a compulsive neurotic character that was partly a result of an "organic damage" of the central nervous system, as well as an "infantile sense of reality". The report stated: "Where a compulsive neurotic character is still complicated by an organic brain lesion, it is often the case that patients still have sufficient insight into the illegality of certain behaviors. In the wrong of their ways (even if they are stupid as the examinee clearly is), but on the grounds of disturbances as described above, they do experience such a disturbance in the exercise of their free will that they—less than the average normal—are unable to determine their will in accordance with any retained understanding of illegality. It is for this reason that we believe that Joseph Kotälla, while committing the offenses charged against him, suffered from some disturbances of his mental faculties such that these facts, if proved, will generally be imputed to him in a diminished degree." 

On 5 December 1951, based on the latest psychiatric report, Kotalla's death sentence was commuted to life imprisonment by royal decree.

References

External link

1908 births
1979 deaths
SS personnel
Holocaust perpetrators in the Netherlands
Nazis who died in prison custody
Prisoners who died in Dutch detention
Nazis convicted of war crimes
Prisoners sentenced to death by the Netherlands